Marlon Fluonia (born 26 September 1964 in Willemstad, Curacao) is a Dutch baseball player who represented the Netherlands at the 1996 Summer Olympics.

References

Dutch baseball players
1964 births
Living people
Olympic baseball players of the Netherlands
Baseball players at the 1996 Summer Olympics
Dutch people of Curaçao descent
People from Willemstad
20th-century Dutch people